The Concrete Blonde is the third novel by American crime author Michael Connelly, featuring the Los Angeles detective Hieronymus "Harry" Bosch. It was published in 1994.

Background
Connelly said that he obtained the seed idea for The Concrete Blonde by reading a book detailing actual cases, written for forensic professionals.

Plot summary
Detective Harry Bosch is pursuing "The Dollmaker", a serial killer who uses makeup to paint his victims.
He gets a tip from a prostitute that a recent customer of hers, Norman Church, had a large amount of women's makeup in his bathroom.

Bosch goes to Church's garage, identifies himself as police, breaks in the door.  Church is naked and shaved. Bosch tells him to not move, but Church starts to pull something from under his pillow, and Bosch shoots him.
Church had been reaching not for a gun, but his toupee.
Bosch is investigated by internal affairs and cleared in the shooting; but, since he did not follow police procedure, he is transferred from the elite Robbery-Homicide Division (RHD) back to the Hollywood table.
The makeup is found to match those of nine of the Dollmaker's victims.

Four years later, Bosch is sued by Church's widow. Her attorney portrays Bosch as a cowboy and a vigilante, seeking revenge for the unsolved murder of his mother when he was a child.

During the trial, the police receive a note, purportedly from the Dollmaker, which leads to the discovery of a new victim killed by someone using the same modus operandi.  Although this victim was encased in concrete, unlike the original eleven victims, all other aspects of the killing are the same, including the signature cross painted on a toenail. Also, this "concrete blonde" victim, along with two other of the original victims, fit a different pattern: that of large-breasted blondes in the local adult entertainment industry who also advertised as high-class prostitutes in the local sex rags.  Bosch and his task force suspect that "the Follower" is Detective Mora from Ad-Vice.  Mora has ties to the adult video industry, had insider knowledge of the Dollmaker case, and was not at work during the killings not attributed to Norman Church.  The task force put Mora under surveillance, and Bosch breaks into Mora's house looking for evidence that he is the Follower.  Instead, Bosch finds that Mora has been making pornographic movies with underage children.  Mora returns to his house, finds Bosch, and threatens to kill him.  The rest of the task force arrives; they search Mora's house and determine that he is not the Follower.

Mora does have information on who he believes is the Follower and makes a deal: he provides the name of Professor Locke, agrees to quit the police force, and all of his crimes will be ignored.  Mora got information that Locke had been seen on the set of adult movies where the slain women were cast members.

When Bosch returns to his office he finds another note from the Follower, saying that he will be taking "his blonde".  Bosch assumes that he means Bosch's girlfriend Sylvia. When she does not answer her phone, Bosch sends the police to her house.  He arrives to an empty house, when a real estate agent shows up to show it.  Bosch finds Sylvia at his house and takes her to a hotel to protect her.  Sylvia tells Bosch that they must have some time apart for her to decide if she can live with him and his dangerous job.

The next day Bosch returns to court as the jury is to restart their deliberations. Honey Chandler, the widow's attorney, does not appear.  Bosch sends the police to her house, as she is also a blonde.  The jury reaches a verdict for the plaintiff and awards compensatory damages of one dollar and punitive damages of one dollar to Church's widow.  When Bosch finally arrives at Chandler's house she has been dead 48 hours, killed in the same manner as the other Dollmaker victims, except that she also has burn and bite marks all over her body.

Locke, who had been missing for several days, shows up at the crime scene.  Bosch and Edgar interrogate him but discover that he has a solid alibi, and dismiss him as a suspect.  Bosch follows Bremmer from the crime scene to his house.  He asks Bremmer if he can come in for a drink to discuss his court case.  When Bremmer returns with two beers Bosch confronts him as being the Follower. Bremmer fights Bosch and gets control of his gun. Bosch, playing on Bremmer's pride, gets him to confess.

Bosch had found a note that the Follower had mailed to Chandler, which mentioned an article in the Los Angeles Times.  Bosch had noticed that it had been mailed before that article was published, which led him to suspect Bremmer.  Bremmer had tortured Chandler to find out where she had hidden the note and envelope.

Bremmer attempts to shoot Bosch, but the gun is empty; Bosch grabs the magazine he had hidden in his sock, hits Bremmer with it, and arrests him.  Bosch had hidden a recording device in the room while Bremmer was getting the beer.

The next day Bosch forces the district attorney's office to charge Bremmer with first degree murder, as the filing attorney is not satisfied with the amount of evidence.  The police then obtain a warrant to obtain blood and hair samples, and teeth molds of Bremmer. His teeth molds match his bite marks on Chandler's body, and his hair samples match pubic hair found on two of the original Dollmaker victims.

A woman who owns a storage locker company recognizes Bremmer as having rented a locker under a false name, and the police find video tapes of Bremmer's killings.  Bremmer makes a deal for life without parole in exchange for leading police to the bodies of his other victims.

Harry takes two weeks off from work to make some home improvements.  Eventually Sylvia returns, and they re-unite and head off for a weekend together.

Characters in The Concrete Blonde
Harry Bosch - Detective in the Los Angeles Police Department
Honey "Money" Chandler - Lawyer for the plaintiff
Rodney Belk - Assistant City attorney, lawyer for the City of Hollywood
Lieutenant Harvey "Ninety-Eight" Pounds - Bosch's supervisor
Joel Bremmer - Writer for the Los Angeles Times; he wrote a book about the Dollmaker after Church's death
Jerry Edgar - Bosch's partner
Dr. John Locke - USC psychologist who helped the police on the Dollmaker case
Hans Rollenberger - Assistant Lieutenant in charge of the Follower task force.
Alva Keyes - US District Court Judge, in charge of the trial 
Sylvia Moore - Bosch's girlfriend, a high school English teacher
Irvin Irving - Assistant Chief of the LA police

Style
The Concrete Blonde is written in the police procedural form of crime fiction. In this style the detective interacts with a wide range of individuals who assist in the investigation.

Reception
Author Janet Evanovich said The Concrete Blonde was "a classic in Connelly's Harry Bosch detective series--and one of my favorites". The Weekly Standard said that Connelly "proved himself a master of courtroom give-and-take in The Concrete Blonde". The Library Journal review in 1994 said "slick plot twists, fast action and fine suspense mark this excellent thriller and courtroom drama".

References

Harry Bosch series
1994 American novels
Novels about serial killers
Novels set in Los Angeles
Little, Brown and Company books